Holme Hall may refer to:

Holme Hall, Bakewell, Derbyshire
Holme Hall, Cliviger, Burnley, Lancashire
Holme Hall, East Riding of Yorkshire. Holme-on-Spalding-Moor

Architectural disambiguation pages